Artur Pontek (en. Arthur Pontek) is a Polish actor, born in Warsaw on 10 May 1975. He studied in Warsaw, where he made his theatrical debut as Mephisto in "Holenderze Tułaczu" in the Zone 2 theatre. He has won multiple Wild Rose awards for best actor, granted by the Polish media, in 2001, 2003 and 2004.

Filmography
1987: Misja Specjalna
1987: Sami dla siebie
1988: Skrzypce Rotszylda
1988: Banda Rudego Pająka – Pająk (en. Spider)
1988: Zmowa – Stasio Sitek
1989: Rififi po sześćdziesiątce
1989: Po własnym pogrzebie – the boy, who asking about stamps on Post Office
1990: Mów mi Rockefeller – Michał "Misio" Malinowski
1992: Das Heimweh des Walerjan Wrobel – Walerian Wróbel
1993 - Pajęczarki – Andrzej's friend
1994 - 1995: Spółka rodzinnna – Krzysiek (en. Chris)
1999: Skok
2001: Buła i spóła – Artek, Waldek's friend
2002-2003: Szpital na perypetiach – male nurse "Wiewiór" (en. "Squirrel")
2004-2007: Kryminalni – member of the police crew
2004: Rodzinka – Karol, Kinga's friend
2006: U fryzjera – Dyzio
2008: Ojciec Mateusz – policeman Marczak

Polish dubbing
2005: Fillmore! – Fillmore
2005: American Dragon Jake Long – Jake
2005: The Buzz on Maggie – Aldrin
2007: High School Musical
2007: Alvin and the Chipmunks
2008: Sam & Max Season One
2009: Power Rangers Jungle Fury – Casey/ Red Ranger
2010: The Avengers: Earth's Mightiest Heroes – Bucky
2011: Scaredy Squirrel – Scaredy

External links
           Filmweb PL
        fdb PL
          film.wp PL
           movies.nytimes EN

References

1975 births
Living people
Male actors from Warsaw
Polish film actors
Polish male film actors
Polish television actors
Polish male stage actors
Polish child actors
Polish male voice actors
20th-century Polish male actors
21st-century Polish male actors